Zapolje may refer to:

 Zapolje, Bosnia and Herzegovina, a village near Bratunac
 Zapolje, Croatia, a village near Rešetari